Huggard is a surname. Notable people with the surname include:

David Huggard (born 1990), better known as Eureka O'Hara, American drag queen
Frank Huggard (1894–1965), Australian rules footballer
Jack Huggard (1901–1972), Australian rules footballer
Jackie Huggard (1926–2016), Australian rules footballer
Walter Huggard, British barrister